Errand may refer to:
 Errand boy
 Errand runner
 Errands, a 1997 novel by Judith Guest

See also
 Fool's errand (disambiguation)